New African is an English-language monthly news magazine based in London. Published since 1966, it is read by many people across the African continent and the African diaspora. It claims to be the oldest pan-African monthly in English, as well as "the bestselling pan-African magazine". It is published by IC Publications, which also publishes African Banker, New African Woman and African Business.

History
The magazine was founded in 1966 under the name African Development. In 1977 it was renamed New African Development, a name that it retained until the following year. In 1978 it was rebranded New African.

Event production

COMESA Investment Forum
IC Publishing and specifically New African magazine served as the host and promoter of a number of trade and investment fairs and/or conferences on behalf of COMESA (Common Market for Eastern and Southern Africa). In particular, the COMESA Investment Forum meetings held in Egypt and the United Arab Emirates have involved a high amount of pro-Chinese programming and media content. Of note, the financial "arm" of COMESA that manages COMESA's trade agreements and investment portfolios is the Preferential Trade Area Bank (PTA Bank), of which the sole non-African member and largest non-regional shareholding state is China.

AFRICASEA Business Forum
IC Publishing is also the organizer and promoter of the Africa and Southeast Asia Business Forum, an annual business conference focused on Sino-African trade relationships. Of note, the primary financial supporter and endorser of the AFRICASEA Forum is BRICS.

Other languages
In 2007 IC Publications launched a French-language edition of the New African entitled Le Magazine De l'Afrique ("The Magazine of Africa"), which features content relating to Francophone Africa.

List of editors
1970 March–July: Editor director - Richard Hall, Editor - Alan Rake
1970 August: Editor - Alan Rake
1977 January: Managing editor - Alan Rake, Editor - Sam Uba, Publisher - Afif Ben Yedder
1978 January–April: Executive director - David Coetzee, Managing editor - Alan Rake
1978 May: Editor-in-chief - Peter Enahoro
1980 January–October: Editor-publisher - Peter Enahoro
1980 November: Editor-in-chief - M. Mlamali Adam
1981 February: Acting editor-in-chief - Alan Rake, Deputy Editor - Baffour Ankomah
1995 January: Editor-in-chief - Alan Rake, Deputy editor - Baffour Ankomah
1999 July/August: Editor - Baffour Ankomah
2018 July/August: Editor - Anver Versi

References

External links
 Official Website
  The digital edition of New African
 New African, Publication Information

1966 establishments in the United Kingdom
News magazines published in the United Kingdom
Africa-focused media
Monthly magazines published in the United Kingdom
Magazines established in 1966
Magazines published in London